Shabnam Moghaddami (born in ) is an Iranian actress.

Filmography

Film and Television 
2012 - Laboratory 
2012 - Kissing the Moon-Like Face
2009 - Ashpaz Bashi (TV series)
2008 - Farzande khak
2008 - There's Always a Woman in Between
2007 - The Reward of Silence
2006 - Zir-e tigh (TV series)
2014 - Madineh (TV series)
2016 - Nafas
2016 - Ferris wheel (TV series)
2018 - Columbus
2018 - Don't Be Embarrassed
2021 - Playing with Stars

Home Video

References

External links
 

Living people
1972 births
People from Tehran
Actresses from Tehran
Iranian film actresses
Iranian stage actresses
Iranian television actresses
Crystal Simorgh for Best Supporting Actress winners